Yangykala Canyon is an eponymous landform in the Balkan Region of north-west Turkmenistan, about 160 km east of Turkmenbashi. The bottom of the canyon was once flooded with Garabogazköl.

References 

Canyons and gorges of Asia